Surprise was a highly successful American privateer schooner. She was launched in 1813 and operated out of Baltimore. She captured over 40 British vessels during her brief career. In one case the capture followed a single-ship action. She was wrecked in April 1815, shortly after the end of the War of 1812.

Voyages
During the voyages below Surprise would often based out of Brest. From there she would go on cruises of six to eight weeks.

Voyage #1
Captain Clement Cathell commissioned Surprise on 14 March 1814. Under his command she captured some 12 British vessels.
  
Fidelity, of North Shields, Hunter, master, was captured on 18 May, off Cape Clear Island, and burnt. 
James & David, Foreman, master, a brig, was sailing from Passages when captured on 18 May; Surprise put the crew of Fidelity on her too, and then gave her up to the crews, after first dismasting her; the  Revenue Cruiser Beresford towed James and David into Baltimore, County Cork, that same day. 
Fox, Hore, master, a schooner, was captured on 16 May about 80 leagues south of Cork as she was sailing from Poole to Newfoundland; Surprise took off Foxs most valuable cargo, put aboard the crew of a brig that Surprise had captured the previous day, and allowed Fox to proceed. Fox reached Cork on 18 May. 
Hebe, ship, of Leith, was sailing from Halifax to Bermuda with naval stores when Surprise captured her in March, and sent into North Carolina.
Kutusoff, Turnbull, master, was sailing from La Guaira when Surprise captured her and sent the brig into Frankfort, Maine. 
Margaret, a brig, Omay, master, was sailing from Lisbon to Dublin when Surprise captured her on 27 May;  recaptured Margaret that day or the next.
Vivid, brig, Ward, master, was sailing from Lisbon to Belfast when Surprise captured her on 27 May;  recaptured Vivid, which then arrived at Cork on 16 June
Fortitude, brig, Touzeau, master, was sailing from Rio de Janeiro to Guernsey when Surprise captured her on 27 May; sent into Union River (Maine) 
1 unidentified vessel
Traveller, of Lieth, Bishop, master, was sailing from North Bergen to Gibraltar when Surprise captured her on 8 May; on 11 May,  recaptured her and sent her into Portsmouth.
Argo, ship, Sibson, master, was sailing from Dublin and Cork to Quebec when Surprise captured her on 5 September and sent her to America. 	
Lively, Benn, master, was sailing from Miramichi 2when Surprise captured and burnt her on 5 September.

Voyage #2
Captain James Barnes commissioned Surprise on 16 August 1814. Under his command she captured some 21 British vessels.

Surprise had only been out ten days from Rhode Island when she captured:
Queen Charlotte, schooner, sailing from St Johns, Newfoundland to Halifax, burnt.
Milnes, ship, Read, master, sailing from Cork to Miramichi, burnt.
However, a frigate encountered Endeavour and chased her on shore near New York, destroying her.
Caledonia, ship, M'Farlane, master, was sailing from Greenock and Cork to Quebec when Surprise captured her and sent to America. However,  recaptured Caledonian, and sent her into Halifax, where she arrived on 26 October. Still, Surprise had plundered Caledonia of 150 packets of her cargo.
Traveler, brig, sailing from Pictou to Harbour Grace, given up to her crew
Eagle, brig, was sailing from St Johns to Halifax, when Surprise captured and plundered her off Sable Island; Surprise gave Eagle up to her crew under cartel, and she arrived at Halifax on 6 September.
, ship, of Hull, Stevenson, master, was sailing from London to Halifax when Surprise captured her on 8 September.  recaptured her and sent her into St Johns, Newfoundland.
Eliza, brig, Henly, master, was sailing from Prince Edward's Island to Swansea when Surprise captured her on 8 September off St Peter's Island. 
Polly, brig, Becket, master, from Cork to Miramachi, burnt; crew put on Eliza 
Willing Maid, brig, Paterson, from London to Pictou, burnt; crew put on Eliza 
Eliza arrived at Swansea on 17 October with the three crews.

Albion, brig, sent into New York 
Ann, schooner, sunk 
Charlotte Ann, schooner, sent into Saco, Maine 
Doris, ship, burnt 
Handy Maid, brig, burnt 
Prince Regent, schooner, burnt; however, Regent, Carr, master, from Portsmouth to Quebec, had been reported sunk by Surprise, but she was reported to have arrived at Quebec on 22 September.
Sally, schooner, burnt 
Wellington, brig, cartel 
3 unidentified.

Voyage #3
Captain Samuel Barstow commissioned Surprise on 8 November 1814. Under his command she captured some ten British vessels.
, Black, master, a brig of Greenock, had been sailing from Alicante to Newfoundland when the privateer Grand Turk captured her.  recaptured Cossack, only to have her fall prey to Surprise. Surprise sent Cossack into Salem.
Forth, brig, burnt 
Good Intent, divested, freed. 
Hazard, schooner, burnt 
Lucy Ann, schooner, cartel 
Mary, schooner, sunk 
Nancy, schooner, retaken 
Sea Flower, schooner, burnt 
: Surprise captured the schooner Star on 28 January 1815, after a single-ship action that lasted an hour. Star had a crew of 26 men and was armed with eight guns; she had one man killed and one wounded before she struck. Surprise had no casualties. Lloyd's List reported that Star, Thompson, master, had been sailing from Batavia to London. Surprise sent Star into New York 
Schooner, cartel

Fate
Surprise returned to New York about 6 March. She had been out four months (48 days from Brest) and had captured 11 vessels. She ran aground on 3 April 1815 in a storm at Manasquan. Fifteen of her crew drowned.

Notes, citations and references
Notes

Citations

References
 
 

1813 ships
Ships built in the United States
Privateer ships of the United States
Maritime incidents in 1815